Planus is a surname of French origin. People with that name include:
 Marc Planus (born 1982), French footballer
 Pierre Planus (born 1979), French footballer

Planus is a Latin adjective meaning "flat" or "plain". It is part of the binomial name of several species, and of some other combination terms.
 Personal honorific or nickname
 Doctor Planus et utilis, a scholastic accolade awarded to the Franciscan teacher Nicholas of Lyra (12701349)
 In biology
 Agrypnus planus, a species of click beetle in the genus Agrypnus
 Aneflus planus, a species of beetle in the family Cerambycidae
 Argopatagus planus, a species of sea urchin of the family Macropneustidae
 Blissus planus, a species of true bug in the genus Blissus in the family Blissidae
 Botrylloides planus, a synonym of Botryllus planus
 Botryllus planus, a species of colonial ascidian tunicate in the genus Botryllus in the family Styelidae
 Brachys planus, a species of beetle in the genus Brachys in the family Buprestidae
 Bransatoglis planus, an extinct species of dormouse
 Brochocoleus planus, a species of beetle in the genus Brochocoleus in the family Ommatidae
 Callionymus planus, a species of dragonet native to the shallow Pacific waters off southern Japan
 Camponotus planus, a species of carpenter ant; see List of Camponotus species
 Canthyporus planus, a species of beetle in the genus Canthyporus in the family Dytiscidae
 Carabus perrini planus, a subspecies of beetle in the family Carabidae
 Carabus planus, a synonym of Pheropsophus aequinoctialis, a ground beetle
 Caracara planus, the crested caracara (also known as the carancho), a bird of prey in the family Falconidae
 Catogenus planus, a species of beetle in the genus Catogenus in the family Passandridae
 Cheliferoides planus, a species of spider in the genus Cheliferoides
 Cleptomartus planus, a synonym of Anthracomartus hindi, an extinct species of arachnid in the genus Anthracomartus in the family Anthracomartidae
 Coccophagus planus, a species of chalcid wasp in the genus Coccophagus
 Copodus planus, an extinct species of cartilaginous fish; see List of prehistoric cartilaginous fish genera
 Corax planus, an extinct species of shark in Corax (genus)
 Craspedites planus, an extinct species of ammonoid cephalopod in the genus Craspedites
 Dermestes planus, a species of beetle in the genus Dermestes in the family Dermestidae
 Dicynodon planus, a synonym of Oudenodon bainii, an extinct dicynodont in the genus Oudenodon
 Distichus planus, a species of beetle in the genus Distichus in the family Carabidae
 Epicadus planus, a species of spider in the genus Epicadus in the family Thomisidae; see List of Thomisidae species
 Eucastor planus, an extinct species of beaver found in the Hawthorn Group
 Ferganosuchus planus, the type species of Ferganosuchus, an extinct genus of gavialid crocodilian
 Gonicoelus planus, a species of beetle in the genus Gonicoelus in the family Biphyllidae
 Grynobius planus, a species of beetle in the family Anobiidae
 Heteroscyphus planus, a species of Marchantiophyta (liverwort)
 Hoplobunus planus, a species of harvestman in the family Stygnopsidae
 Hyalodiscus planus, a species of diatom in the genus Hyalodiscus
 Hydroporus planus, a species of water beetle in the genus Hydroporus
 Ischyodus planus, an extinct species of cartilaginous fish in the genus Ischyodus
 Isurus planus, also known as the hook-tooth mako, an extinct mako shark that lived during the Miocene epoch
 Larinus planus, a species of true weevil
 Leptodius planus, a species of crab in the genus Leptodius in the family Xanthidae
 Leptotrachelus planus, a species in the genus Leptotrachelus (beetle) in the family Carabidae
 Lionychus planus, a species of beetle in the genus Lionychus in the family Carabidae
 Metacyclops planus, a species of copepod crustacean in the genus Metacyclops in the family Cyclopidae
 Microcosmus planus, a species of Microcosmus, a genus of tunicates in the family Pyuridae
 Oesyperus planus, a species of beetle in the genus Oesyperus in the family Carabidae
 Pachyscelus planus, a species of beetle in the genus Pachyscelus in the family Buprestidae
 Palaeospheniscus planus, incorrect name for the extinct species of penguin Palaeospheniscus bergi
 Pandanus planus, a synonym of Pandanus tectorius, a species of screwpine
 Penestomus planus, a species of spider in the genus Penestomus
 Philodromus planus, a species of philodromid crab spider in the genus Philodromus in the family Philodromidae; see List of Philodromidae species
 Philophlaeus planus, a species of beetle in the genus Philophlaeus in the family Carabidae
 Polydesmus planus, a species of millipede in the genus Polydesmus
 Protorabus planus, a species of beetle in the subfamily Protorabinae in the family Carabidae
 Psellonus planus, a species of spider in the genus Psellonus in the family Philodromidae; see List of spiders of India
 Pseudaspidites planus, an extinct species of mollusc in the genus Pseudaspidites; see 2012 in molluscan paleontology
 Pseudoparasitus planus, a species of mite in the genus Pseudoparasitus
 Pseudospheniscus planus, incorrect name for the extinct species of penguin Palaeospheniscus bergi
 Pterostichus planus, a species of ground beetle in the genus Pterostichus
 Pyrnus planus, a species of spider in the genus Pyrnus in the family Trochanteriidae; see List of Trochanteriidae species
 Rhipicephalus planus, a species of tick in the genus Rhipicephalus in the family Ixodidae
 Senoculus planus, a species of spider in the genus Senoculus in the family Senoculidae
 Sigaretornus planus, a species in the genus Tornus (gastropod)
 Smerinthus planus, The oriental eyed hawkmoth, a moth of the family Sphingidae
 Sphenodus planus, an extinct species of shark in the genus Sphenodus in the family Orthacodontidae
 Styloniscus planus, a species of woodlouse in the genus Styloniscus
 Syngonanthus planus, a species of plant in the genus Syngonanthus in the family Eriocaulaceae
 Tornus planus, a synonym of Sigaretornus planus
 Trachelas planus, a species of spider in the genus Trachelas in the family Trachelidae; see List of Trachelidae species
 Trochus planus, a synonym of Bembicium nanum, a species of sea snail
 Vetustodermis planus, a soft-bodied middle Cambrian animal, a species in the genus Vetustovermis
 Wilcoxius planus, a species of robber fly (or, assassin fly) in the genus Wilcoxius in the family Asilidae; see List of Asilidae species: W
 Other uses
 Cantus planus, Latin for plainsong (or, plainchant), a body of chants used in the liturgies of the Western Church
 Lichen planus, a disease of the skin and/or mucous membranes that resembles lichen
 Pes planus, a medical term for flat feet (or, fallen arches), a postural deformity in which the arches of the foot collapse

See also 
 

French-language surnames